Mississinewa may refer to:

 Mississinewa River in Indiana
 USS Mississinewa may refer to:
, a Cimarron-class fleet oiler, was launched 28 March 1944 and sunk 15 November 1944.
, a Neosho-class fleet oiler, was in service from 1955 to 1991.
 Mississinewa High School
Treaty of Mississinewas, 1826
Mississinewa Lake Dam
 The Battle of the Mississinewa
 Mississinawa Township, Darke County, Ohio